In this article, the results of Al Nassr Club of Saudi Arabia in 2008-2009 season is summarized

Team kit

|
|

Current first team squad

Saudi Professional League

Results

Results summary

Results by round

Al-Nasr Standing in 2008-2009 League

Disciplinary record
 Disciplinary records for 2008–09 league matches. Players with 1 card or more included only.

King Cup of Champions

Quarter-final

Al-Hilal qualified by Away goals rule.

First leg

Second leg

Crown Prince Cup

Round of 16

Quarter-final

Semi-final

Saudi Federation cup

Group stage

Group D Standing

Semi-finals

Final

Gulf Club Champions Cup

Group stage

Group A Standing

Semi-final
Al-Nasr Game against Al-Ahli was supposed to be the semi final. However, FIFA suspended the Kuwait Football Association and Kuwaiti National Teams and clubs were suspended from all international matches and activities because of the government interference in the affairs of the football federation. Therefore, the other semi final between Al Qadisiya and Al Salmiya (both from Kuwait) has been canceled and Al-Nasr and Al-Ahli match was considered as the final.

Final

First leg

Second leg

Goal scorers

Under 20 Team

Results

Results by round

Al-Nasr Standing

Under 17 Team

Results

Results by round

Al-Nasr Standing

References
kooora.com - Arabic
goalzz.com - English

Al Nassr FC seasons
Al-Nasr